Barronsfield is a community in the Canadian province of Nova Scotia, located in  Cumberland County. It is named after Captain Edward Barron.

References

External links
Barronsfield on Destination Nova Scotia

Communities in Cumberland County, Nova Scotia